Czekaj may refer to the following places:
Czekaj, Łódź Voivodeship (central Poland)
Czekaj, Subcarpathian Voivodeship (south-east Poland)
Czekaj, Świętokrzyskie Voivodeship (south-central Poland)
Czekaj, Żyrardów County in Masovian Voivodeship (east-central Poland)